"Love's Unkind" is a 1977 song written and produced by Giorgio Moroder and Pete Bellotte, with lyrics and vocals by Donna Summer.  It was recorded for the Donna Summer album, I Remember Yesterday, which combined modern disco beats with sounds of previous decades. "Love's Unkind" was released as a single in Europe in November 1977, reaching number three in the UK, and number 32 in the Netherlands. Though never released as a single in the USA, it topped the dance chart as part of the I Remember Yesterday album, as at that time entire albums could count as one entry on that particular chart. The lyrics are of high school crushes and love triangles.

Weekly charts

Certifications and sales

Cover versions

British singer-songwriter Toyah Willcox recorded a version for her 1987 album Desire.

English actress Sophie Lawrence reached #21 on the UK Singles Chart in 1991 with her cover of the song.

Estonian artist Onu Bella covered (parodied) the song in Estonian, titled "Koolis on vahva" ("School Is Fun") on his 1992 album "Ma võtsin viina" ("I Drank Vodka").

Scottish Pop-Rock band Texas sampled the song for their 2021 single, “Mr Haze”.

References

1977 singles
Casablanca Records singles
Donna Summer songs
Songs about school
Songs written by Donna Summer
Songs written by Giorgio Moroder
Songs written by Pete Bellotte
Song recordings produced by Giorgio Moroder
Song recordings produced by Pete Bellotte
1977 songs
GTO Records singles